Brand-Briesen Airfield is a redeveloped military air base located at Briesen/Brand, part of Halbe in Dahme-Spreewald, Brandenburg, Germany, about  south-southeast of Berlin. Since 2004, the former CargoLifter airship hangar has been converted by a Malaysian company Tanjong into a leisure resort called Tropical Islands Resort.

History

The airfield was built by the Luftwaffe during the expansion of the military by Nazi Germany, between 1938 and 1939. When opened it had a single  runway.

The airfield was occupied by the Red Army in May 1945. From this point forward, several units of the Soviet Air Force were stationed here.

This allowed the base to house a fighter regiment, which was equipped with air superiority fighter aircraft, requiring the construction, in 1970, of 10 Hardened aircraft shelters (HAS), and in 1972 a second parallel  main runway. In the late 1970s additional HAS's were added bringing their numbers to 24, with a nuclear alert bunker built in the early 1980s.

With the reunification of Germany from 1989/1990, the Soviet Army agreed to return all military bases by the end of 1994. With the assistance of an airlift undertaken by Antonov An-22 aircraft, the airfield was handed back to the Federal Government of Germany in 1992.

CargoLifter

In 1996, the CargoLifter company was founded in Wiesbaden, who intended to build airships. While the former north main runway was being demolished, CargoLifter began building the then-largest freebearing hall in the world in the centre of the site, where they intended to set up production of airships. The hall (360 m long, 220 m wide and 106 m high), was a freestanding steel-dome "barrel-bowl" construction, large enough to fit the Eiffel Tower on its side. The hangar was also equipped with a 180 m cutting table to manufacture the airship's envelope. Construction of the hall was complete in November 2000, at a cost of €78M.

Tropical Islands Resort

CargoLifter managed to construct operational prototypes, but went bankrupt in mid-2002.

In June 2003, receivers sold the hall and 500 hectares of grounds to Malaysian company Tanjong, who converted the hall into a leisure park called Tropical Islands Resort.

References

External links
My Tropical Islands

World War II airfields in Germany
Military facilities of the Soviet Union in Germany
Airports in Brandenburg
Defunct airports in Germany
Buildings and structures in Dahme-Spreewald